Mikhail Vasilievich Kuleshov (born January 7, 1981, in Perm, Soviet Union) is a former professional ice hockey player. He played in the National Hockey League with the Colorado Avalanche.

Playing career
Kuleshov was drafted in the 1st round, 25th overall, in the 1999 NHL Entry Draft by the Colorado Avalanche. A member of the Russian U/18 team in 1999, Kuleshov played parts of four seasons in the Russian Super League before coming to North America at the end of the 2000–01 season.

Kuleshov made his North American debut with the Avalanche's affiliate, the Hershey Bears of the American Hockey League, joining the team for their play-off run. He then spent the next three season's in the AHL before he made his NHL debut during the 2003–04 season. Mikhail only played 3 games for the Avalanche before he was sent back to the Bears.

A free agent upon the 2004 NHL Lockout, Kuleshov returned to Russia playing the season with SKA Saint Petersburg and Molot-Prikamye Perm of the RSL. Kuleshov last played with Yunost Minsk of the Belarusian Open League.

Career statistics

Regular season and playoffs

International

References

External links
 

1981 births
Avangard Omsk players
Colorado Avalanche draft picks
Colorado Avalanche players
Severstal Cherepovets players
Hershey Bears players
Living people
Molot-Prikamye Perm players
National Hockey League first-round draft picks
Sportspeople from Perm, Russia
Russian ice hockey left wingers
SKA Saint Petersburg players